Chowdhury is a title of honour, usually hereditary, originating from the Indian subcontinent. It is an adaption from Sanskrit. During the Mughal rule, it was a title awarded to eminent people, while during British rule, the term was associated with zamindars and social leaders. The common female equivalent was Chowdhurani. Many landlords under the Permanent Settlement carried this surname. Land reforms after the partition of India abolished the permanent settlement. In modern times, the term is a common South Asian surname for both males and females.

Meaning and significance
"Chowdhury" is a term adapted from the Sanskrit word caturdhara, literally "holder of four" (four denoting a measure of land, from chatur ("four") and dhara ("holder" or "possessor")). The name is a Sanskrit term denoting the head of a community or caste. It was a title awarded to persons of eminence, including both Muslims and Hindus, during the Mughal Empire. It was also used as a title by military commanders responsible for four separate forces, including the cavalry, navy, infantry and elephant corps. These people belonged to the zamindar families in British India.

Regional 
In the Chittagong Hill Tracts, the titular Rajas of the Bohmong Circle and Mong Circle have the surname Chowdhury.

The Bengali Muslim Mirashdars living in the former Kachari Kingdom were given titles by the Kachari Raja, which in modern-day acts as a surname for them.

In Bihar, the Pasi are also known as the Chaudhary, a community traditionally connected with toddy tapping.

Many Marwaris coming from Agarwal and Maheshwari sub community also use surname as Choudhary or Chaudhary.

Alternate spellings
Its alternate spellings include: Chaudhary, Chaudri, Choudhary, Chaudhry, Chowdary, Chowdhary, Chaudry, Choudary, Choudhry, Chaudhuri, Chaudhari, Chudhry, Choudhari, Choudhury, Chowdhuri and Chowdury. The female equivalent is Chaudhurani and alternate spellings include: Choudhurani, Chowdhurani, Chowdhrani, Choudhrani, Chaudhrani.

Notable people

Bangladesh

 Abdul Latif Chowdhury, Islamic scholar and writer
 Abdul Matin Chaudhary, minister and politician
 Abdul Matin Chowdhury, academic and physicist
 Abdul Matin Chowdhury, politician
 Abdul Matin Chowdhury, religious scholar and political activist
 Abdul Munim Chowdhury, former MP for Habiganj-1
 Abdur Rouf Choudhury, writer
 Abed Chaudhury, geneticist and science writer
 Abidur Reza Chowdhury (1872–1961), Bengali politician and educationist
 Abu Lais Md. Mubin Chowdhury, former MP for Habiganj-3
 Abu Osman Chowdhury, Sector Commander of the Mukti Bahini
 Justice Abu Sayeed Chowdhury, second President of Bangladesh
 Justice A. F. M. Ahsanuddin Chowdhury, 9th President of Bangladesh
 Anwarul Karim Chowdhury, former UN Under Secretary General
 Ariful Haque Choudhury, Mayor of Sylhet
 A. Q. M. Badruddoza Chowdhury, 13th President of Bangladesh
 Ayesha Bedora Choudhury, doctor
 Justice Badrul Haider Chowdhury, fifth Chief Justice of Bangladesh
 Chanchal Chowdhury, actor
 Farid Uddin Chowdhury, teacher, politician and businessman
 Fazlul Qadir Chaudhry, 5th Speaker of the National Assembly of Pakistan
 Chowdhury Gulam Akbar, writer and collector of Bengali folk literature for the Bangla Academy
 Chowdhury Tanbir Ahmed Siddiky, former Minister of Commerce
 Golam Ali Chowdhury, Zamindar of Haturia and philanthropist
 Harris Chowdhury, former MP for Sylhet-5
 Hasan Mashhud Chowdhury, 11th Chief of Army Staff of the Bangladesh Army
 Humayun Rashid Choudhury, 41st President of the United Nations General Assembly & 7th Speaker of the Bangladesh National Parliament
 Iftekhar Ahmed Chowdhury, diplomat and former Foreign Affairs Adviser
 Izharul Islam Chowdhury, Bangladeshi Islamic scholar
 Jamilur Reza Choudhury, president of Bangladesh Mathematical Olympiad, vice-chancellor of University of Asia Pacific, adviser to Caretaker Government of Bangladesh
 Chowdhury Kazemuddin Ahmed Siddiky, founding president of Assam Bengal Muslim League 
 Mahmudul Amin Choudhury, 11th Chief Justice of Bangladesh
 Mahmud Us Samad Chowdhury, former MP for Sylhet-3
 Mainur Reza Chowdhury, 12th Chief Justice of Bangladesh
 Mehazabien Chowdhury, actress
 Mizanur Rahman Chowdhury, fifth Prime Minister of Bangladesh
 Mukhlesur Rahman Chowdhury, journalist and editor turned politician. Advisor to the President of Bangladesh (2006-2007)
 Naiyyum Choudhury, biotechnologist and nuclear scientist
 Najma Chowdhury, founder of the Women and Gender Studies department in the University of Dhaka, adviser to Caretaker Government of Bangladesh
 Nazim Kamran Choudhury, former MP
 Rashed Chowdhury, former Army officer, currently in exile in the United States
 Rezwana Chowdhury, renowned exponent of Tagore songs
 Sadruddin Ahmed Chowdhury, physicist and vice-chancellor of Shahjalal University of Science and Technology and Sylhet International University
 Salah Choudhury, editor of Weekly Blitz
 Samson H. Chowdhury, Bengali Christian entrepreneur and business leader
 Samarjit Roy Chowdhury, painter
 Shahinur Pasha Chowdhury, politician
 Shamima K Choudhury, physicist and advocate for women in science
 Shamsher M. Chowdhury, diplomat and former secretary of the Ministry of Foreign Affairs
 Shamsul Huda Chaudhury, third Speaker of the Bangladesh National Parliament
 Shirin Sharmin Chaudhury, Speaker of the Bangladesh National Parliament
 Shayan Chowdhury, Bengali indie musician and singer
 Shegufta Bakht Chaudhuri, 4th Governor of Bangladesh Bank
 Syed Nawab Ali Chowdhury, Nawab of Dhanbari, Tangail
 Tapan Chowdhury, Bengali singer of Adhunik songs
 TIM Fazle Rabbi Chowdhury, six-time MP and former leader of the Jatiya Party (Zafar)
 Yahya Chowdhury, former MP for Sylhet-2
 Yeamin Ahmed Chowdhury Munna, footballer for Chittagong Abahani
 Yakub Ali Chowdhury, essayist

India

 Abdul Jalil Choudhury (1925–1989), Islamic scholar and politician
 Abdul Munim Choudhury, former MLA of Karimganj South
 Mahendra Mohan Choudhury, Chief Minister of Assam and Governor of Punjab
 Upendrakishore Ray Chowdhury, 19th century aristocrat
 Amitabh Chaudhry (born 1964/65), Indian banker, CEO and MD of Axis Bank
 Anjan Choudhury, Bengali film director and writer
 A. B. A. Gani Khan Choudhury, Railway Minister of India
 Aniruddha Roy Chowdhury, Indian film director
 Adhir Ranjan Chowdhury, member of the 16th Lok Sabha of India
 Arindam Chaudhuri, Indian author
 Farukh Choudhary, Indian Association football player who plays for Jamshedpur FC in the Indian Super League
 Rahul Chaudhari, Indian kabaddi player
 Somlata Acharyya Chowdhury, Indian singer
 Sonali Chowdhury, Indian actress
 Chumki Choudhury, Indian actress
 Rina Choudhury, Indian actress
 Tridha Choudhury, Indian actress
 Jogen Chowdhury, 21st century Indian painter
 Pramatha Chaudhuri, 19th century Bengali writer and an influential figure in Bengali literature
 Salil Chowdhury, Indian music director & composer
 Nirad C. Chaudhuri, Indian writer
 Shankar Roychowdhury, Chief of Staff of the Indian Army
 Mrinal Datta Chaudhuri, theoretical economist, academic and professor of the Delhi School of Economics.
 Joyanto Nath Chaudhuri, Chief of Staff of the Indian Army
Ravi Shankar (born Rabindra Shankar Chowdhury),  Indian musician and a composer of Hindustani classical music
 Bula Choudhury, Indian national women's swimming champion 
 Najib Ali Choudhury, Islamic scholar and teacher
 Sarita Choudhury, Indian actress and model
 Chaudhary Charan Singh, 6th Prime Minister of India
 Pratik Chaudhari (born 1989), Indian footballer playing as a defender for Jamshedpur
 Veerabhadram Chowdary, film director
 Renuka Chowdhury, Union Minister of State
 Saifuddin Choudhury, former Member of Parliament
 Veeramachineni Jagapathi Rao Chowdary, Telugu film actor
 Chaudhary Devi Lal, Deputy Prime Minister of India 
 K. V. Chowdary, Indian Revenue Service Central Vigilance Commissioner
 Chaudhary Harmohan Singh Yadav, Shaurya Chakra awardee
 Shagun Chowdhary, Indian shooter
 Chaudhary Brahm Prakash Yadav, Chief Minister, Delhi
 Mahima Chaudhry, Indian actress and model
 Mohinder Singh Chaudhury, Indian politician
 Rita Chowdhury, established poet and novelist, Sahitya Akademi Award recipient
 Aadesh Chaudhary, Indian actor
 R. B. Choudary, Indian film producer
 Y. S. Chowdary, Indian central minister for state
 Gurmeet Choudhary, Indian television actor
 Ranjit Chowdhry, Indian actor 
 Karmveer Choudhary, Indian actor
 Kamla Chaudhry (born 1908), Indian short story writer
 Yuvika Chaudhary (born 1983), Indian actress
Amit Chaudhuri, Fellow of the Royal Society of Literature
Ankush Chaudhari, Marathi film actor
Ambikagiri Raichoudhury, Assamese poet
 Moinul Hoque Choudhury, five-time MLA, two-time UN General Assembly representative and Minister of Industrial Development
 Rashida Haque Choudhury, former Minister of State of Social Welfare
 Avinov Choudhury

Nepal
 Binod Chaudhary, Nepalese billionaire

Fiji
 Mahendra Chaudhry, former Prime Minister of Fiji

Pakistan

Cecil Chaudhry, Pakistani academic, human rights activist, veteran fighter pilot
Chaudhry Muhammad Ali, fourth Prime Minister of Pakistan
Choudhry Rahmat Ali, Pakistan Movement activist and politician
Fawad Chaudhry, Federal Minister for Information and Broadcasting

Chaudhry Shujaat Hussain, 14th Prime Minister of Pakistan
Iftikhar Muhammad Chaudhry, former Chief Justice of Pakistan
 and founder of Atlas Air (FY 2019 revenue US$2.7 billion)
Rafi Muhammad Chaudhry (1903–1988), nuclear physicist
Chaudhry Nisar Ali Khan, Minister of Interior of Pakistan

United Kingdom
 Akhlaq Choudhury, Judge of the British High Court of Justice
 Anwar Choudhury, diplomat at the Foreign and Commonwealth Office; former Governor of the Cayman Islands, British Ambassador to Peru and British High Commissioner to Bangladesh 
 Anjem Choudary, Islamist political activist
 Asim Chaudhry, comedian and actor
 Foysol Choudhury MBE – Businessman, community activist and Chairman of Edinburgh and Lothians Regional Equality Council.
 Hamza Choudhury, midfielder for English football club Leicester City F.C.
 Himanshi Choudhry, British actress
 Khaled Choudhury, theatre personality and artist
 Mamun Chowdhury – Businessman, and founder and co-director of London Tradition.
 Navin Chowdhry - British actor
 Roshonara Choudhry, British Islamic extremist
 Shamim Chowdhury, TV and print journalist for Al Jazeera English
 Shefali Chowdhury, actress best known for the role of Padma Patil in the Harry Potter film series
 Sophie Choudry, British actress and singer
 Paul Chowdhry English comedian of Punjabi origin.

United States
 Jay Chaudhry (born 1958/1959), American billionaire, CEO and founder of Zscaler
 Michael Chowdry, founder of cargo airliner Atlas Air
 Satveer Chaudhary, former Minnesota state senator
 Subir Chowdhury, author and management consultant

Chaudhurani
 Faizunnesa Choudhurani, Muslim feminist and awarded the title Nawab by Queen Victoria
 Indira Devi Chaudhurani, Indian literary figure, author and musician.
 Karimunnesa Khanam Chaudhurani (1855–1926), Bengali poet, social worker, and patron of literature.
 Sarala Devi Chaudhurani, founder of the first women's organisation in India, the Bharat Stree Mahamandal in Allahabad in 1910.

Fictional characters
Indra Chaudhari, the protagonist of Axiom Verge 2

Notes

References

Bengali-language surnames
Titles in Bangladesh
Indian surnames
Pakistani names
Punjabi-language surnames
Gujarati-language surnames